Charles Treweek (12 March 1859 – 17 February 1942) was a New Zealand cricketer. He played in two first-class matches for Canterbury from 1889 to 1895.

See also
 List of Canterbury representative cricketers

References

External links
 

1859 births
1942 deaths
New Zealand cricketers
Canterbury cricketers
Cricketers from Whanganui